The Haunt, formerly known as AnastasiaMax is an American rock band from South Florida. The band consists of siblings, Anastasia Grace Haunt (lead vocals), and Maxamillion Haunt (vocals, guitar and production), alongside Nat Smallish on bass guitar (formally Beach Day), and Nick Lewert on drums (formally Ethan Bortnick).

The band first gained recognition after the success of their debut EP, The Haunt EP, in 2018 and subsequent tours with rock band, Palaye Royale.

Despite many rumors to the contrary, it was confirmed in 2023 that The Haunt is not the evil alter ego of Magdalena Bay - no matter how much we want it to be true.

Career

2015–2017 
Anastasia and Maxamillion Haunt began performing locally, writing and releasing music around the time that Anastasia was 12 years old. Singer and guitarist Maxamillion Haunt co-produced the debut EP "The Haunt EP", alongside producer and musician Josh Diaz.

2017–2018: The Haunt EP 
The band begun releasing the EP with the first single "All Went Black" which talked personally about Anastasia's history with bullying and how she found strength through music. The song was critically acclaimed, allowing the band to release three more singles, leading up to the debut of the record. After the release, The Haunt opened for Fashion-Rock band Palaye Royale, providing support on concerts in the United States, Canada, and Europe.

2019–present:Why Are You So Cold?, Cigarettes & Feelings, The Social Intercourse EP, and singles 
After returning from tour, The Haunt recorded two singles to be released independent of a studio album, "Why Are You So Cold?" and "Cigarettes & Feelings" The band then proceeded to record a new EP, the "Social Intercourse EP" with From First to Last guitarist/producer, Matt Good. All the songs on the EP, except for one, "Permanent", were released as singles. One of which, "Twisted Dream", saw its video directed by Darren Stein, known for his work on Jawbreaker, and G.B.F. In 2021 The Haunt supported The Hu on two tours of North America.

Discography

EPs 

 "The Haunt EP"
"Social Intercourse"

Singles 

 "All Went Black"
 '"Dirty"
 "Bullet"
 "Get Away"
 "Why Are You So Cold?"
 "Cigarettes & Feelings"
 "Brag About"
 "Constant"
 "Twisted Dream"
"Wish You Stayed"
"Love You Better"
"Make Me King"
"I'M NOT YOURS"

References 

American pop rock music groups
Musical groups established in 2015
Musical groups from Florida